Craig McKellar (born 8 December 1949) is a former Australian rules footballer who played with Richmond and Melbourne in the Victorian Football League (VFL) during the 1970s.

A knock ruckman, McKellar was recruited to Richmond from Woodville and represented South Australia at the 1969 Adelaide Carnival. After making his debut for Richmond in 1971 he played in a losing Grand Final team in 1972 and their premiership team in 1973. He continued to play with Richmond until 1975 when, after being omitted from their finals side, he announced his retirement.

Melbourne, however, convinced McKellar to continue and he spent three seasons with the Demons. Although he never won Richmond's best and fairest award, he was their top Brownlow Medal vote getter in both the 1972 and 1975 counts. He also played interstate football for Victoria.

References

Holmesby, Russell and Main, Jim (2007). The Encyclopedia of AFL Footballers. 7th ed. Melbourne: Bas Publishing.

1949 births
Living people
Australian rules footballers from South Australia
Richmond Football Club players
Richmond Football Club Premiership players
Melbourne Football Club players
Woodville Football Club players
One-time VFL/AFL Premiership players